Handsworth Wood railway station was a railway station in Handsworth Wood, Birmingham, England, on the London and North Western Railway's rail link between the Chase Line and the West Coast Main Line.  The station operated between 1896 and 1941, and like neighbouring station Soho Road, closed during the Second World War, as a result of decreasing use by passengers who possibly found the new 16 bus route more convenient.

The station site lies in a cutting through Handsworth Park, adjacent to St. Mary's Church.

References

 Warwickshire Railways entry

Disused railway stations in Birmingham, West Midlands
Former London and North Western Railway stations
Railway stations in Great Britain opened in 1896
Railway stations in Great Britain closed in 1941
Handsworth, West Midlands